"The Ground Walks, with Time in a Box" is a song by American alternative rock band Modest Mouse. It is the second single from their sixth studio album Strangers to Ourselves.

Weekly charts

References

2015 singles
2015 songs
Epic Records singles
Modest Mouse songs
Songs written by Isaac Brock (musician)
Songs written by Jeremiah Green
Songs written by Tom Peloso